Tomás Sebastián De Vincenti (born 9 February 1989) is an Argentine professional footballer who plays as an attacking midfielder for Super League Greece club Lamia.

Club career

PAS Giannina
Born in Buenos Aires, De Vincenti was spotted by PAS Giannina scouting team during his youth career with CA Excursionistas, resulting in his first ever professional contract, with a duration of four years. During his time at Ioannina, and despite his young age, he was one of the leading figures of his club's promotion into Greek Superleague in 2011, as well as their relegation avoidance next year. During the season 2012–2013, PAS Giannina made a surprisingly good run, finishing up fifth in the league, with De Vincenti being one of the key players.

Due to the high standard of his performances in Greek Superleague, he inevitably drew the attention of several Greek Superleague clubs, including the champions, Olympiacos, and Panathinaikos. The latter side made an offer for a paid transfer during the winter transfer window, but it was rejected by the PAS Giannina board, because the player had preemptively accepted to leave on a free transfer for Olympiacos side the following summer, but also because he was an important player for the second half of the season. The decision was proven to be the right one, with PAS Giannina finishing higher on the league than Panathinaikos, despite their significantly lower budget.

Perhaps his most notable moment so far has been his away goal against Panathinaikos side, which led to a valuable away draw with 1–1, during the Greek Superleague season 2012–2013. The goal was voted by Greek Superleague fans as the best goal of the entire season, gaining over 50% of the total votes. It was also featured in several worldwide best goals lists. It is commendable that even the Panathinaikos side applauded him for this incredible effort, despite costing them 2 points that would prove to be extremely costly for them, due to the fact that the Panathinaikos side under-performed heavily in the season, finishing up sixth on the table.

Olympiacos
De Vincenti penned a three-year contract with Greek Superleague champions Olympiacos shortly after the playoffs for the Greek Superleague ended, honoring the verbal agreement he made several months earlier. In his first season at Olympiacos he didn't manage to establish himself in the first team, and on 2 September 2013 he was given on a five-month loan at his former team PAS Giannina.

APOEL

2013–14
On 3 January 2014, De Vincenti joined Cypriot First Division side APOEL, on a six-month loan deal from Olympiacos. He made his official debut on 22 January 2014, excelling in APOEL's 0–1 away victory against AEL Limassol for that season's Cypriot Cup. De Vincenti made an impressive start at APOEL, scoring eight times in his first nine league matches. He scored his first two official goals on 1 February 2014, in his team's 3–0 home win against Ermis Aradippou for the Cypriot First Division and then he scored three more times in the next two league matches, once against Anorthosis in APOEL's 2–1 away win on 5 February 2014, and twice against Apollon Limassol four days later, in his team's 2–1 home victory. On 11 May 2014, De Vincenti scored the first hat-trick of his career in APOEL's 8–1 home triumph over Anorthosis for the Cypriot First Division play-offs, netting three goals in the first 32 minutes of the match. On 21 May 2014, De Vincenti scored the first goal in APOEL’s 2–0 win against Ermis Aradippou in the Cypriot Cup final and won his first ever career title. Ten days later, De Vincenti won also the Cypriot First Division after APOEL's 1–0 away victory against AEL Limassol in the title deciding match of the competition.

2014–15
On 30 July 2014, he scored APOEL's first goal and created the second one, in his team's 2–2 first leg draw against HJK Helsinki at Sonera Stadium for the third qualifying round of the UEFA Champions League. One week later, he scored again against HJK Helsinki, converting a penalty he won himself and helping APOEL to qualify for the play-off round of the 2014–15 UEFA Champions League after a 2–0 home victory. On 26 August 2014, he scored the second goal in APOEL's 4–0 triumph over Aalborg BK for the UEFA Champions League play-off round, helping his team to reach the group stage of the UEFA Champions League. De Vincenti made also five group stage appearances in APOEL's 2014–15 UEFA Champions League campaign. On 2 May 2015, after 29 league matches without a goal, he scored his first Cypriot First Division goal for the season, opening the scoring from the penalty spot in APOEL's dramatic 3–2 win against arch rivals Omonia. On 20 May 2015, De Vincenti scored a stunning 35-meter free kick in APOEL's 4–2 Cypriot Cup final triumph over AEL Limassol to win his third trophy with APOEL in Cyprus. On 24 May 2015, De Vincenti scored the opening goal in APOEL's 4–2 victory over Ermis Aradippou and celebrated the double, as his team secured their third consecutive championship title.

2015–16
On 21 July 2015, De Vincenti scored APOEL's decisive away goal against FK Vardar, as his team scraped through the second qualifying round of the UEFA Champions League on the away goals rule with a 1–1 draw at Skopje. One week later he scored again, netting the second goal in APOEL's 2–1 victory against FC Midtjylland at MCH Arena for the third qualifying round of the UEFA Champions League. He ended the 2015–16 season as a champion for a third time in the row, setting a new personal league scoring record of 15 goals in 26 appearances.

2016–17
On 2 August 2016, in a match that proved to be his last for APOEL, De Vincenti scored the third goal in his team's 3–0 home victory against Rosenborg BK for the third qualifying round of the UEFA Champions League, as APOEL overturned a 2–1 first leg defeat and reached the play-off round of the competition.

Al Shabab (Dubai)
On summer 2017 the club merged with Dubai CSC to re-brand the club into Shabab Al-Ahli Dubai FC.

Return to APOEL
On 25 June 2018, Vincenti returned to his former club APOEL FC on a three-year contract. He won the Cypriot First Division in the season 2018–19 and the Cypriot Super Cup in 2019.

Lamia
In summer 2022 he moved to Lamia.

Club statistics

Honours
APOEL
Cypriot First Division: 2013–14, 2014–15, 2015–16, 2018–19
Cypriot Cup: 2013–14, 2014–15
Cypriot Super Cup: 2013, 2019

References

External links
APOEL official profile

Greek Superleague official profile and stats

1989 births
Living people
Argentine footballers
Association football midfielders
Kalamata F.C. players
PAS Giannina F.C. players
Olympiacos F.C. players
Super League Greece players
APOEL FC players
Cypriot First Division players
Al Shabab Al Arabi Club Dubai players
Shabab Al-Ahli Club players
PAS Lamia 1964 players
UAE Pro League players
Argentine expatriate footballers
Expatriate footballers in Greece
Expatriate footballers in Cyprus
Expatriate footballers in the United Arab Emirates
Argentine expatriate sportspeople in Greece
Argentine expatriate sportspeople in Cyprus
Argentine expatriate sportspeople in the United Arab Emirates
Footballers from Buenos Aires